Hugo Javier Vélez Benítez (born May 26, 1986) is an Ecuadorian footballer who plays as a midfielder for LDU Portoviejo.

References

External links
FEF card  

1986 births
Living people
People from Portoviejo
Association football midfielders
Ecuadorian footballers
L.D.U. Portoviejo footballers
C.D. Universidad Católica del Ecuador footballers
C.D. El Nacional footballers
L.D.U. Quito footballers
Mushuc Runa S.C. footballers
Ecuadorian Serie A players